The Abbott Farm Historic District is a National Historic Landmark archaeological site in New Jersey. It is the largest known Middle Woodland village of its type on the East Coast of the United States. Significant evidence suggests that the Delaware River floodplain was occupied by Paleoindian people for a long period. It was inhabited between 500 BC and 500 AD. It has been a source of controversy and debate around early development.

The John A. Roebling Memorial Park, part of the Abbott Marshlands, provides access to both historic sites and nature habitats in the area. The district was added to the National Register of Historic Places as the Abbott Farm Archeological Site on December 8, 1976 for its significance in prehistory and science.

The importance of this site was established in the late 19th century by Charles Conrad Abbott, an archaeologist whose farm was located on one of the bluffs overlooking the marshlands.  Abbott's finds on his farm, published in 1876, sparked a debate about when humans first arrived in the area, and consequently had significant influence on the direction of later archaeological work.  Many finds from the site are at Harvard University's Peabody Museum of Archaeology and Ethnology, for which Abbott served as assistant curator for many years.

Historic sites
In addition to its archaeological importance, the area includes historically important buildings and transportation-related structures, such as:
 
 Bow Hill – Hamilton Township
 Isaac Watson House – Hamilton Township 
 Point Breeze – Bordentown

Gallery

See also
List of National Historic Landmarks in New Jersey
Assunpink Trail
Lenape Trail
Minisink Archeological Site
National Register of Historic Places listings in Burlington County, New Jersey
National Register of Historic Places listings in Mercer County, New Jersey

References

External links
 
 

Historic districts on the National Register of Historic Places in New Jersey
National Historic Landmarks in New Jersey
History of Trenton, New Jersey
Archaeological sites on the National Register of Historic Places in New Jersey
Native American history of New Jersey
National Register of Historic Places in Mercer County, New Jersey
National Register of Historic Places in Burlington County, New Jersey
Bordentown, New Jersey
Bordentown Township, New Jersey
Hamilton Township, Mercer County, New Jersey
Farms on the National Register of Historic Places in New Jersey
New Jersey Register of Historic Places